Rajganj may refer to:
Rajganj, Jalpaiguri, a town/suburb of the Indian city of Jalpaiguri
Raiganj subdivision, Uttar Dinajpur district, West Bengal, India
Rajganj (Community development block), an administrative division in Jalpaiguri district, West Bengal, India
Rajganj (Vidhan Sabha constituency), an assembly constituency in the Vidhan Sabha of West Bengal
Rajganj, Dhanbad, a census town in Dhanbad district, Jharkhand